Fullilove v. Klutznick, 448 U.S. 448 (1980), was a case in which the United States Supreme Court held that the U.S. Congress could constitutionally use its spending power to remedy past discrimination. The case arose as a suit against the enforcement of provisions in a 1977 spending bill that required 10% of federal funds going towards public works programs to go to minority-owned companies.

Opinion of the Court 
The Court was deeply divided as to both the rationale for the decision and the outcome.  Five separate opinions were filed, none of which commanded the support of more than three members of the Court. Chief Justice Burger wrote a plurality opinion, joined by Justices White and Powell; Justice Powell also wrote a separate concurrence. Justice Marshall delivered an opinion for a concurrence with an entirely different basis in law, joined by Justices Brennan and Blackmun. Since there was neither a single opinion that represented the views of a majority of the court nor a clear proposition in opinion that commanded a majority, only the judgment of the court, affirming the United States Court of Appeals for the Second Circuit, unambiguously has precedential value.

The Court held that the minority set-aside program was a legitimate exercise of congressional power, and that under the particular facts at issue, Congress could pursue the objectives of the minority business enterprise program under the Spending Power. The plurality opinion noted that Congress could have regulated the practices of contractors on federally funded projects under the Commerce Clause as well. The plurality further held that in the remedial context, Congress did not have to act "in a wholly 'color-blind' fashion."

Dissent 
Two dissenting opinions were written, one by Justice Stewart, joined by Justice Rehnquist, and the other by Justice Stevens. Justice Stevens objected to the congressional procedures to determine the 10% set-aside figure.

Subsequent history 
Fullilove v. Klutznick was overruled by Adarand Constructors, Inc. v. Peña. There the Court adopted strict scrutiny for race preference in federal contracting.  This brought the standard of review into uniformity with City of Richmond v. J.A. Croson Co., which applied strict scrutiny for race preferences in state and local government contracting.

See also
List of United States Supreme Court cases, volume 448

References

External links
 

United States Supreme Court cases
United States Supreme Court cases of the Burger Court
United States affirmative action case law
United States equal protection case law
1980 in United States case law
United States racial discrimination case law